Coppa Sergio Valci is the annual men's domestic round-robin association football cup competition in Vatican City.

History
The Vatican cup competition known as the Coppa ACDV was created in 1985. It was renamed the Coppa Sergio Valci in 1994 honoring long-time Vatican employee and FA president Sergio Valci. Since 2007, the Coppa Sergio Valci winners compete against the winners of the Campionato della Città del Vaticano, the Vatican's football league, for the Supercoppa.

Winners

Source:

Notes

References

External links
Vatican Sports

Recurring sporting events established in 1985
National association football cups
1985 establishments in Vatican City
Football in the Vatican City